Jan von Holleben (born 1977) is a German photographer.

Life and work
Born in 1977 and brought up in the southern German countryside, he lived most of his youth in an alternative commune near Freiburg and identifies a strong connection between the development of his photographic work and the influence of his parents, a cinematographer and child therapist. At the age of 13, he followed his father's photographic career picking up a camera and experimenting with all sorts of "magical tricks", developing his photographic imagination and skills with friends and family and later honing his technique in commercial settings.

After pursuing studies in teaching children with disabilities at the Pädagogische Hochschule in Freiburg, he moved to London, earned a degree in the Theory and History of Photography at Surrey Institute of Art and Design, and became submerged within the London photographic scene, where he worked as picture editor, art director and photographic director. He quickly set up two photographic collectives, Young Photographers United and photodebut, followed more recently by The Photographer's Office. His body of photographic work focusing on the ‘homo ludens’ – the man who learns through play, is itself built from a playful integration of pedagogical theory with his own personal experiences of play and memories of childhood.

Jan von Holleben's work has been exhibited internationally and published widely throughout the world.

His work has been published amongst others in Die Zeit, Spiegel Wissen, Dein Spiegel, Chrismon, Neon, Creative Review, Dazed& Confused, Diva, Day 4, Dummy, Emotion, Geo, Geolino, Zeit Magazin, Zeit Campus, Adbusters, Art Review, Bant, Brigitte, Dumbo Feather, DPI, IDN, Irish Times, Label, Liberation, Max, Next Level, Ojodepez, Photo Review, Photography, Repubblica, Rojo, Style 100, The Face, The Sunday Review, Sleazenation, SZ-Magazin, Vice, Vogue Girl and many more.

Education 

 1997               Baccalaureate Diploma (A-Levels) – Martin-Schongauer-Gymnasium_Breisach, Breisach
 1997–2000     Photographic Apprentice – Prisma Productions, Freiburg
 1999–2000     Studies in Teaching Children with Disabilities – Pädagogische Hochschule, Freiburg
 2000–2002     BA (Hons) Photography (Theory and History) – SIAD University, Farnham

Book Publications
11-21, The Photographer's Office, London, 2007. 
Dreams of Flying, The Photographer's Office, London, 2007. 
Träume vom Fliegen, Hoffmann & Campe, Hamburg, 2008. 
The Snowbed, The Photographer's Office, London, 2008. 
Dreams of Flying vol.2, The Photographer's Office, London, 2009. 
Mutatis Mutandis, The Photographer's Office, London, 2010. 
HO HO HO, The Photographer's Office, Berlin, 2011. 
Kriegen das eigentlich alle? Gabriel Verlag im Thienemann Verlag, Stuttgart, 2013. 
Konrad Wimmel ist da! Gabriel Verlag im Thienemann-Esslinger Verlag, Stuttgart, 2014. 
Kinderlieder aus Deutschland und Europa, Carus Verlag & Gabriel Verlag im Thienemann-Esslinger Verlag, Stuttgart, 2014. 
Does that happen to everyone? Gestalten Verlag, Berlin, 2014. 
DENKSTE?! Gabriel Verlag im Thienemann Verlag, Stuttgart, 2014. 
mit Jane Baer-Krause: Wie heißt dein Gott eigentlich mit Nachnamen? Gabriel Verlag im Thienemann-Esslinger Verlag, Stuttgart, 2015. 
That’s what you think! Gestalten Verlag, Berlin, 2015. 
WWWas? Gabriel Verlag im Thienemann-Esslinger Verlag, Stuttgart, 2016. 
ABC Photography, Tarzipan Verlag, Berlin, 2016. 
Und was wird jetzt mit mir? Gabriel Verlag im Thienemann-Esslinger Verlag, Stuttgart, 2016. 
KOSMOS, Little Steidl Verlag, Göttingen, 2017. 
Wenn ich KanzlerIn von Deutschland wär, Gabriel Verlag im Thienemann-Esslinger Verlag, Stuttgart, 2017. 
Monsterhelden, Beltz Verlag, Weinheim, 2017. 
Meine Wilde Wut, Beltz Verlag, Weinheim, 2018. 
Mach mit! Carlsen Verlag, Hamburg, 2018. 
ALLES IMMER - das Bilderbuch, Beltz Verlag, Weinheim, 2019. ISBN 978-3-407-75453-0
ALWAYS EVERYTHING - the picture book, Tarzipan books, 2019. ISBN 978-0955447082
Wie geht Politik? Gabriel Verlag im Thienemann-Esslinger Verlag, Stuttgart, 2021. ISBN 978-3522305921

Awards 

 2014: Wissenschaftsbuch des Jahres / Wien
 2010: Lens Culture Award – Honorable Mention / San Francisco
 2009: Aesthetica Award – Runner up / London
 2009: Unicum Award – Best Ad / Bochum
 2009: Lead Award – Auszeichnung / Hamburg
 2008: Backlight Artist’s Residency, Finland
 2008: Bronze – Idn + graniph Universe Award / Tokyo
 2008: Nomination – Joop Swart Master Class, Amsterdam
 2007: Photography Masters Cup/ London-Beverly Hills
 2007: PHE07 Best Photography Books of 2007 for ‘Dreams of Flying’/ Madrid
 2007: Gold – PX3 Photography Award / Paris
 2007: Gold – Best CP Award / Munich
 2007: Finalist – Cedefop Award / Thessaloniki
 2007: Gold – Art for Aid Award / Amsterdam
 2006: International Photography Award / Los Angeles
 2006: Young Portfolio Award / Kiyosato
 2006: Free Range Photographic Ambassador / London
 2006: Magenta Award / Toronto
 2006: Honours – Hyeres Festivale de la Photographie / Hyeres
 2006: Gold – Lead Award / Hamburg
 2006: Festimage / Chaves
 2006: Photoreview Award / Langhorne
 2004: London Photographic Award / London
 2004: The Observer Hodge Photographic Award / London
 2004: International Photography Award / Los Angeles
 1998: FotoSalon Preis / Kirchzarten

Permanent Installations 

 V&A Museum of Childhood, London, UK, 2006
 John Radcliffe Children Hospital, Oxford, UK, 2014
 Charité Children Cancer Ward, Berlin, Germany, 2015
 Demelza, children hospice, Kent, UK, 2016
 AIDA Perla, International, 2018
 SOS Children's Village International Embassy, Berlin, Germany, 2018
 Charité Palliativ Care Unit, Berlin, Germany, 2019
 Boston Children's Hospital, Boston, USA, 2021

Exhibitions (selection) 
2020 Always Everything, V&A Museum of Childhood, London
2019 Alles Immer, Freiburg/ Reutlingen/ Langenau/ Bad Saulgau/ Bodelshausen/ Walddorfhäslach/ Rottenburg am Neckar, Germany
2016 Homo Ludens, in der Tulla, Mannheim
 2015 Magic Bodø, Parkart Festival, Bodø
 2014 The Amazing Analogue, The Brighton Photo Biennial, Hove Museum, Brighton
 2012: Lily & Jonathan, John Radcliffe Children Hospital, Oxford
 2010 Best of 000-010, Gesto, Porto
 2010: Nur gespielt, Städtische Galerie Friedrichsbau, Bühl
 2009: Mutatis Mutandis, Farmani Gallery, New York
 2009: Liebesorte, C/O Berlin
 2008: It'll happen here, Marcia Wood Gallery, Atlanta
 2007: Wir werden immer größer, Peter Hay Helpert Fine Art, New York
 2007: Dreams of Flying, V&A Museum of Childhood, London
 2006: Dreams of Flying, Peter Hay Helpert Fine Art, New York (K)
 2005: Dreams of Flying, Nogoodwindow, Paris
 2001: The Apricot, Kunstverein Kirchzarten,  Kirchzarten

Images

Weblinks 
Jan von Holleben Official Website
Interview in DUMBO FEATHER Magazin
NPR How To Fly Using Only A Camera And A Ladder
Paris Match - Le monde enfantin de Jan von Holleben
Frankfurter Allgemeine Zeitung - Pubertätsbuch: Alle Freiwillige vor zur Kusstestmaschine

References 

1977 births
Living people
Photographers from Baden-Württemberg
Artists from Freiburg im Breisgau